Carole Penny Marshall (October 15, 1943 – December 17, 2018) was an American actress, director and producer. She is known for her role as Laverne DeFazio on the television sitcom Laverne & Shirley (1976–1983), receiving three nominations for the Golden Globe Award for Best Actress – Television Series Musical or Comedy for her portrayal.

Marshall made her directorial debut with Jumpin' Jack Flash (1986) before directing Big (1988), which became the first film directed by a woman to gross more than $100 million at the U.S. box office. Her subsequent directing credits included Awakenings (1990), which was nominated for the Academy Award for Best Picture, A League of Their Own (1992), Renaissance Man (1994), The Preacher's Wife (1996) and Riding in Cars with Boys (2001). She also produced Cinderella Man (2005) and Bewitched (2005), and directed episodes of the TV series According to Jim and United States of Tara.

Early life
Carole Penny Marshall was born in the Bronx, New York City, on October 15, 1943, to Marjorie Irene (née Ward), a tap dance teacher who ran the Marjorie Marshall Dance School, and Anthony "Tony" Masciarelli, later Anthony Wallace Marshall, a director of industrial films and later a producer. She had a brother, actor/director/TV producer Garry Marshall; and a sister, television producer Ronny Hallin. Penny's birth name, Carole, was selected because her mother's favorite actress was Carole Lombard. Her middle name was selected because her older sister Ronny, wanting a horse, was saving pennies; their mother chose the middle name in an attempt to console Ronny.

Penny's father was of Italian descent, his family having come from Abruzzo, and her mother was of German, English, and Scottish descent; Marshall's father changed his  surname from Masciarelli to Marshall before she was born. Religion played an odd role in the Marshall children's lives. Garry was christened Episcopalian, Ronny was Lutheran, and Penny was confirmed in a Congregational Church, because "[Mother] sent us anyplace that had a hall where she could put on a recital. If she hadn't needed performance space, we wouldn't have bothered."

She grew up at 3235 Grand Concourse, the Bronx, in a building which was also the childhood home of Neil Simon, Paddy Chayefsky, Calvin Klein, and Ralph Lauren. She began her career as a tap dancer at age three, and later taught tap at her mother's dance school. She graduated from Walton High School, a public girls' high school in New York and then went to University of New Mexico for 2 years where she studied math and psychology. While at UNM, Marshall became pregnant with daughter Tracy Reiner (née Tracy Henry), and soon after married the father, Michael Henry, in 1963. The couple divorced three years later in 1966. During this period, Marshall worked various jobs to support herself, including working as a choreographer for the Albuquerque Civic Light Opera Association. In 1967, she moved to Los Angeles to join her older brother Garry, a writer whose credits at the time included TV's The Dick Van Dyke Show (1961–1966).

Career

Marshall first appeared on a television commercial for Head and Shoulders beautifying shampoo. She was hired to play a girl with stringy, unattractive hair, and Farrah Fawcett was hired to play a girl with thick, bouncy hair. As the crew was lighting the set, Marshall's stand-in wore a placard that read "Homely Girl" and Fawcett's stand-in wore a placard that said "Pretty Girl". Fawcett, sensing Marshall's insecurity about her looks, crossed out "Homely" on the Marshall stand-in placard and wrote "Plain". 

Marshall and Billie Hayes were the only actresses to audition for the role of Witchiepoo for H.R. Pufnstuf, produced by Sid and Marty Krofft. Marshall thought that she was not right for the part, and Hayes got the role.

In 1968 Marshall accepted an offer from her brother to appear in a movie he had written and was producing, called How Sweet It Is! (1968). She landed another small role in the film The Savage Seven (1968), as well as a guest appearance on the hit television series That Girl, starring Marlo Thomas. Marshall was considered for the role of Gloria Bunker Stivic on All in the Family, but lost the part to Sally Struthers.

In 1970, Garry Marshall became the executive producer of the television series The Odd Couple. The following year, Marshall was added to the permanent cast to play a secretary, Myrna, and held the role for four years. In Marshall's final appearance on The Odd Couple, her character married her boyfriend, Sheldn ("they left the "o" off the birth certificate", she explains), played by Rob Reiner, her real-life husband. The episode included Marshall's real-life siblings, Garry and Ronny, as Myrna's brother and sister.

While she was on The Odd Couple, Marshall played small roles in TV movies such as Evil Roy Slade (1972), starring John Astin and Mickey Rooney (and produced by brother Garry); The Crooked Hearts (1972) starring Douglas Fairbanks Jr., in which she played a waitress; The Couple Takes a Wife, starring Bill Bixby; and Wacky Zoo of Morgan City (1972). 

In 1974, James L. Brooks and Allan Burns cast Marshall as Janice Dreyfuss, sister-in-law to Paul Dreyfuss (played by actor Paul Sand) in the series Paul Sand in Friends and Lovers. It aired on CBS-TV Saturday nights beginning September 14, 1974. Despite good reviews and decent ratings, it was canceled mid-season. Brooks and Burns, along with studio head Grant Tinker, were so impressed with Marshall's comedic talent that the following season, they hired Marshall and actress Mary Kay Place to play Mary Richards' new neighbors (Paula and Sally Jo) on The Mary Tyler Moore Show.

Garry Marshall, creator and then part-time writer for Happy Days, cast Marshall and Cindy Williams to guest appear on an episode of the show. The installment, titled "A Date with Fonzie", aired on November 11, 1975, and introduced the characters Laverne DeFazio and Shirley Feeney (played by Marshall and Williams, respectively). In that episode, Laverne and Shirley were a pair of wisecracking brewery workers who were dates for Fonzie (Henry Winkler) and Richie (Ron Howard). The pair were such a hit with the studio audience that Garry Marshall decided to co-create and star them in a successful spinoff, Laverne & Shirley (1976–1983). 

The characters of Laverne and Shirley appeared in five more episodes of Happy Days. In 1982 at the beginning of Laverne & Shirleys eighth season, Williams left the show due to her pregnancy. Marshall continued with the show, but it was canceled after that season's final episode aired in May 1983.

In 1983, while still filming Laverne & Shirley, Marshall resumed working with James L. Brooks when she guest starred on Taxi in a cameo appearance as herself. In the Taxi episode "Louie Moves Uptown," Marshall is turned down for residency in a new high-rise condominium in Manhattan. The Laverne & Shirley episode "Lost in Spacesuits" is referred to in the scene.

Marshall would again work with Brooks, now a co-producer for the animated series The Simpsons, when she lent her voice to Ms. Botz, a.k.a. Ms. Botzcowski, the "babysitter bandit," on the first produced episode of The Simpsons, making her the first official guest star to appear on the show. 

Marshall also played a cameo role as herself on the HBO series Entourage. She also made a cameo appearance alongside her brother Garry in the Disney Halloween-themed movie Hocus Pocus as husband and wife. She was reunited with her Laverne & Shirley co-star, Cindy Williams, on a November 2013 episode of Sam & Cat.

Directing career

With the encouragement of her brother, Marshall became interested in directing. While starring on Laverne and Shirley, she began her directing career with four episodes of that show.  

In 1979, she directed several episodes of the short-lived sitcom Working Stiffs, starring Michael Keaton and James Belushi. She soon moved on to theatrical films; her first film was going to be Peggy Sue Got Married (which at that point was scheduled to star Debra Winger in the leading role). Marshall and the writers of the film, however, had creative differences, and Marshall left the project, with Winger also leaving out of loyalty to Marshall.

Marshall was soon given the directorial job of Jumpin' Jack Flash (1986) starring Whoopi Goldberg after the original director dropped out of the project. She also gave her daughter Tracy and her brother Garry roles in the film. Marshall described her leap into directing feature films as very hard to learn, likening it to "cramming four years of college into one semester." 

While on set all day, she spent her nights planning out the rest of the film, trying to get it finished on time. Marshall also added that Whoopi Goldberg would take her aside and calm her down if she was looking exhausted that day. 

In 1999, Marshall's Parkaway Productions company was transferred from Universal to Sony. Jessica Cox was hired to run the company in 2000.

Marshall directed several successful feature films from the mid-1980s onwards, including Big (1988) starring Tom Hanks (the first film directed by a woman to gross over US$100 million), Awakenings (1990) starring Robin Williams and Robert De Niro, A League of Their Own (1992) with Geena Davis, Tom Hanks, Madonna and Rosie O'Donnell, and The Preacher's Wife (1996) starring Denzel Washington and Whitney Houston. In 1991, she was awarded the Women in Film Crystal Award.

In 2010 and 2011, Marshall directed two episodes of the Showtime series United States of Tara. Women in Film and Video presented her with the Women of Vision Award in 2013. Marshall planned on developing a biopic on Effa Manley, but it never materialized.

Personal life
While at college, Marshall met Michael Henry, a football player, and left school at age twenty to marry him in 1963. They had one daughter named Tracy in 1964 (now Tracy Reiner). The marriage lasted three years.

On April 10, 1971, Marshall married actor and director Rob Reiner, who later adopted Tracy. Her marriage to Reiner ended in 1981. The couple had five grandchildren.

Marshall had a brief relationship with singer Art Garfunkel in the mid-1980s, and he credits her with helping him through his depression.

In 2010, it was reported that Marshall had been diagnosed with lung cancer that had metastasized to her brain, but two years later she was "fine now". Following her recovery she published a memoir, My Mother Was Nuts.

Death
Marshall died in Los Angeles on December 17, 2018, at the age of 75. According to her death certificate, the causes were cardiopulmonary failure, atherosclerotic cardiovascular disease, and diabetes mellitus type 1.

Marshall is interred at Forest Lawn Memorial Park in Hollywood Hills. The 'L' from her Laverne character is emblazoned at the bottom of her headstone.

Filmography

Film

Producer
 Calendar Girl (1993) (executive producer)
 Getting Away with Murder (1996)
 With Friends Like These... (1998)
 Risk (2003)
 Cinderella Man (2005)
 Bewitched (2005)

Acting roles

Television
Director

Acting roles

Analysis

Cinematic techniques used 

One of Penny Marshall’s styles is the use of simple pictures that allow the actor to convey the message. All her films are not multi-million dollar movies filled with special effects or fancy camera action. However, she employs a loose framing-focusing camera on actors so that they are distinguished from the background. The loose framing focus is accompanied by very strong lighting of the scene to increase visibility on specific objects and important characters in the scene.
Additionally, throughout her directing, she uses film to tell a story. She does not attempt to use film as an art form. Thus, all her story sources are made up of original and adapted screenplays. For instance, Big was written by Gary Ross; best known as film writer and producer of Pleasantville. Additionally, Anne Spielberg who wrote "Toy Story" is one of the accomplished film writers and producers. Moreover, "Awakenings" was adapted from Oliver Sack’s book and written by Steven Zaillian for the screen. Steven is the writer of Schindler's List and A Civil Action, just to name a few.
Furthermore, she relies on character techniques to portray the meaning of themes in the films. For instance, she uses prominent characters like Malcolm Sayer and Josh Baskin whose characters reflect their persona as well as draw people to the film. Additionally, Penny Marshall places a big emphasis on the settings which are very selective in details.
Another Penny Marshall technique is that her films are classical. For instance, Marshall's best directorial accomplishment was in Awakenings that starred Robin Williams and Robert DeNiro. The film was nominated for Best Actor (Robert DeNiro), Best Picture, and Best Adapted Screenplay. "Awakenings" is organized upon a three-act structure. A League of their Own is a tale that is strongly centered on the plot; and there exist both bad and good people, as well as characters that get changed by their experiences.

Central themes in Marshall's films 
Marshall's films tend to address contemporary issues in society such as coming of age, women’s accomplishments, and oppression of the mentally disabled. For instance, the oppression of the mentally disabled is well elaborated in the film Awakenings. The film unites two big stars in a story about the plight of mentally disabled individuals and how a person who is not living with any life-threatening condition gets to learn a lesson about humanity after spending time with a mentally disabled person. Achievement of women has been elaborated well in the film A League of Their Own, a film that stars two blood sisters joining the women’s baseball league during World War II. In that time, many men in professional leagues joined the armed forces. The movie exposes exciting victories and personal conflicts on the field, while, at the same time, building sisterhood and strong bonds among teammates.

Awards
 1978: Golden Globe Nominee—Best Performance by an Actress in a Television Series—Musical or Comedy
 1979: Golden Globe Nominee—Best Performance by an Actress in a Television Series—Musical or Comedy
 1980: Golden Globe Nominee—Best Actress in a Television Series—Comedy or Musical Laverne & Shirley
 1988: Venice Film Festival Winner—Children and Cinema Award—Special Mention for Big (1988)
 1990: Saturn Award Nominee—Best Director for film Big (1988) (Academy of Science Fiction, Fantasy and Horror Films USA)
 1992: American Comedy Awards Winner—Lifetime Creative Achievement Award
 1992: Hochi Film Awards Winner—Best Foreign Film for A League of Their Own
 1994: New York Women in Film and Television Winner of Muse Award
 1995: Flaiano International Prizes Winner—Career Award in Cinema
 1997: Elle Women in Hollywood Awards Winner—Icon Award (shared with Meryl Streep, Jane Campion, and Laura Ziskin)
 1998: Munich Film Festival Winner of High Hopes Award for With Friends Like These...
 2000: Online Film & Television Association Winner—OFTA TV Hall of Fame
 2002: Cabourg Romantic Film Festival—Golden Swann Winner for film Riding in Cars with Boys (2001)
 2004, Star on the Walk of Fame at 7021 Hollywood Blvd.
 2013: Society of Camera Operators Winner—Governor's Award

References

External links

 
 
 Turner Classic Movies
 
 
 
 
 Penny Marshall at Aveleyman (older version)

1943 births
2018 deaths
20th-century American actresses
21st-century American actresses
Actresses from New York City
American Congregationalists
American film actresses
American people of Italian descent
Film producers from New York (state)
American people of English descent
American people of German descent
American people of Scottish descent
American stunt performers
American television actresses
American television directors
American women film directors
Burials at Forest Lawn Memorial Park (Hollywood Hills)
Comedy film directors
Deaths from diabetes
Film directors from New York City
People from the Bronx
People of Abruzzese descent
University of New Mexico alumni
American voice actresses
American women television directors
American women film producers
Reiner family